Love & Dance (translit. Sipur Hatzi-Russi) is a 2006 Israeli drama film directed by Eitan Anner. It was entered into the 28th Moscow International Film Festival.

Cast
 Evgenia Dodina as Yulia
 Avi Kushnir as Rami
 Oksana Korostyshevskaya as Lena
 Kirill Safonov as Roman
 Vladimir Volov as Chen
 Valeria Voevodin as Natalie
 Talya Raz as Sharon
 David Kogen as Arthur
 Liron Alzrkiy as Esti
 Daniel Fridman as Shaaf
 Aviel Cohen as Stas

References

External links
 

2006 films
2006 drama films
Israeli drama films
2000s Hebrew-language films